Yhú is a district in the Caaguazú department of Paraguay. The name is derived from a Guaraní word for "black water."

Sources 
World Gazeteer: Paraguay – World-Gazetteer.com

Populated places in the Caaguazú Department